Krali Marko Crag (‘Krali Markov Kamak’ \kra-'li 'mar-kov 'ka-m&k\) is the rocky ridge extending 6.45 km in west-southwest to east-northeast direction, 1.57 km wide, and rising to 851 m in the east part of Voden Heights on Oscar II Coast in Graham Land.  It surmounts Scar Inlet to the east.  The feature is named after the settlement of Krali Marko in Southern Bulgaria.

Location
British mapping in 1976.

Maps
 British Antarctic Territory.  Scale 1:200000 topographic map.  DOS 610 Series, Sheet W 65 62.  Directorate of Overseas Surveys, Tolworth, UK, 1976.
 Antarctic Digital Database (ADD). Scale 1:250000 topographic map of Antarctica. Scientific Committee on Antarctic Research (SCAR). Since 1993, regularly upgraded and updated.

Notes

References
 Krali Marko Crag. SCAR Composite Antarctic Gazetteer.
 Bulgarian Antarctic Gazetteer. Antarctic Place-names Commission. (details in Bulgarian, basic data in English)

External links
 Krali Marko Crag. Copernix satellite image

Ridges of Graham Land
Oscar II Coast
Bulgaria and the Antarctic